Nathrop is an unincorporated town, a post office, and a census-designated place (CDP) located in and governed by Chaffee County, Colorado, United States. The Nathrop post office has the ZIP code 81236. At the United States Census 2010, the population of the 81236 ZIP Code Tabulation Area was 1,017 including adjacent areas.

History
Nathrop was named for Charles Nachtrieb, owner of the townsite. In 1880, the Denver and Rio Grande Railroad built through Nathrop as part of their Tennessee Pass line. The tracks were placed out of service in 1997, but Union Pacific, present-day owner of the line, may reach an agreement to reopen it.

Geography

Ruby Mountain
Ruby Mountain is a  rhyolite outcrop located about one mile northeast of Nathrop.  Small spessartite garnet crystals are found throughout the outcropping.  Small pebbles of black obsidian referred to as "Apache tears" by collectors can also be found in the talus rock at the base of the cliffs.

Demographics

Attractions
Alpine Tunnel
Arkansas Headwaters Recreation Area
Browns Canyon National Monument
Mount Princeton
San Isabel National Forest
St. Elmo

See also

Outline of Colorado
Index of Colorado-related articles
State of Colorado
Colorado cities and towns
Colorado census designated places
Colorado counties
Chaffee County, Colorado
Arkansas Headwaters Recreation Area
Browns Canyon National Monument

References

External links

Nathrop @ Colorado.com
Nathrop @ UncoverColorado.com
History of Nathrop
Arkansas Headwaters Recreation Area
Browns Canyon National Monument
Chaffee County website
San Isabel National Forest website

Census-designated places in Chaffee County, Colorado
Census-designated places in Colorado
Colorado populated places on the Arkansas River